Daniel Kirkwood (September 27, 1814 – June 11, 1895) was an American astronomer.

Kirkwood was born in Harford County, Maryland to John and Agnes (née Hope) Kirkwood. He graduated in mathematics from the York County Academy in York, Pennsylvania in 1838. After teaching there for five years, he became Principal of the Lancaster High School in Lancaster, Pennsylvania, and after another five years he moved on to become Principal of the Pottsville Academy in Pottsville, Pennsylvania. In 1851, he was elected as a member to the American Philosophical Society. The same year he became Professor of Mathematics at Delaware College and in 1856 Professor of Mathematics at Indiana University in Bloomington, Indiana, where he stayed until his retirement in 1886, with the exception of two years, 1865–1867, at Jefferson College in Canonsburg, Pennsylvania.

Kirkwood's most significant contribution came from his study of asteroid orbits. When arranging the then-growing number of discovered asteroids by their distance from the Sun, he noted several gaps, now named Kirkwood gaps in his honor, and associated these gaps with orbital resonances with the orbit of Jupiter. Further, Kirkwood also suggested a similar dynamic was responsible for Cassini Division in Saturn's rings, as the result of a resonance with one of Saturn's moons. In the same paper, he was the first to correctly posit that the material in meteor showers is cometary debris.

Kirkwood also identified a pattern relating the distances of the planets to their rotation periods, which was called Kirkwood's Law. This discovery earned Kirkwood an international reputation among astronomers; he was dubbed "the American Kepler" by Sears Cook Walker, who claimed that Kirkwood's Law proved the widely held Solar Nebula Theory. The "Law" has since become discredited as new measurements of planetary rotation periods have shown that the pattern doesn't hold.

In 1891, at age 77, he became a lecturer in astronomy at Stanford University. He died in Riverside, California in 1895.

Altogether he wrote 129 publications, including three books. The asteroid  was named 1578 Kirkwood in his honor and so was the lunar impact crater Kirkwood, as well as Indiana University's Kirkwood Observatory. He is buried in the Rose Hill Cemetery in Bloomington, Indiana, where Kirkwood Avenue is named for him.

Kirkwood was a cousin of Iowa governor Samuel Jordan Kirkwood who became United States Secretary of the Interior under President James A. Garfield and President Chester A. Arthur.

Further reading
Frank K. Edmondson,"Daniel Kirkwood: Dean of American Astronomers," Mercury Magazine (publication of the Astronomical Society of the Pacific), vol. 29, no. 3 (2000), pp. 26–33.
J. Donald Fernie 1999, "The American Kepler," The New Scientist vol. 87, no. 5, pg. 398.

References

External links

"Daniel Kirkwood papers, 1864-1895" finding aid for the collection at the Indiana University Archives, Bloomington

1814 births
1895 deaths
American astronomers
Planetary scientists
Washington & Jefferson College faculty
Indiana University faculty
Presidents of the University of Delaware
People from Harford County, Maryland